Luckenbach is an Ortsgemeinde – a community belonging to a Verbandsgemeinde – in the Westerwaldkreis in Rhineland-Palatinate, Germany.

Geography

The village lies northeast of Koblenz in the valley of the Kleine Nister. Luckenbach belongs to the Verbandsgemeinde of Hachenburg, a kind of collective municipality.

History
In 1366, Luckenbach had its first documentary mention.

Politics

The municipal council is made up of 13 council members, including the extraofficial mayor (Bürgermeister), who were elected in a majority vote in a municipal election on 13 June 2004.

Economy and infrastructure

South of the community runs Bundesstraße 414, leading from Hohenroth to Hachenburg. The nearest Autobahn interchanges are in Siegen, Wilnsdorf and Herborn on the A 45 (Dortmund–Gießen), some 25 km away. The nearest InterCityExpress stop is the railway station at Montabaur on the Cologne-Frankfurt high-speed rail line.

References

External links
  

Municipalities in Rhineland-Palatinate
Westerwaldkreis